This is a list of South Korean films that received a domestic theatrical release in 2017.

Box office
The highest-grossing South Korean films released in 2017, by domestic box office gross revenue, are as follows:

Released

See also
2017 in South Korea
2017 in South Korean music

References

External links

2017
Film
South Korean